Valayil Korath Mathews is an entrepreneur and the Founder Chairman of IBS Software Services, a software product company based out of India. He is regarded as a thought leader in the global aviation industry  and has been a speaker at various international events conducted by IATA, Harvard Business School, and NASSCOM.

Early life
Mathews belongs to Kizhakkambalam, a village in Ernakulam district in Kerala, India. He spent his entire childhood there along with his father, mother, two brothers, and a sister. His father was one of the founding managers of the Federal Bank and mother a home maker.

Mathews did his schooling in St Joseph's School, Kizhakkambalam and attended pre-university at St Peter's College, Kolenchery, Ernakulam. He took his under graduation in Mechanical Engineering from Mar Athanasius College of Engineering, Kothamangalam, Ernakulam. He completed post graduation in Aeronautical Engineering from IIT Kanpur and then executive management program from Harvard Business School.

Career
Mathews started off his career as a faculty member at the Military College for Indian Army in 1980, teaching computer science. From 1981 to 1983, he worked as systems analyst with Air India. From 1983 to 1997, he worked as the General Manager at Emirates. He founded IBS Software Services in 1997.

Honours and awards
George Thomas Kottukappally Trust Award 2014 for ethical business person in association with Alumni Association St Thomas College Pala
 V C Padmanabhan Memorial Award 2015
 Management Leadership Award of 2013
 Business Man of the Year Award
 IT Man of the Year Award
 Millennium Leadership Award
 Enterprise Excellence Award.

Positions held
 Member, IT Advisory Board / Higher Education Council, Government of Kerala
 Member, Board of Directors, Kerala State Industrial Development Corporation, Government of Kerala
 Member, Board of Directors, IIITM-K
 Chairman, TATF
 Charter member, TiE
 Chairman, Kerala State Council, Confederation of Indian Industry
 Chairman, GTECH
 Executive council member, NASSCOM
 Member, Governing Council, Technopark, Trivandrum
Member, Kerala State Innovation Council

Philanthropy 
Mathews initiated in setting up the Divine Children's Home in Trivandrum for destitute children. He mobilised US$100,000 from Oakridge National Lab, USA to support this initiative.

References

Living people
Businesspeople from Kerala
Businesspeople in software
Harvard Business School alumni
Year of birth missing (living people)